The International Development Finance Club (IDFC) is a partnership of development banks whose aim is to complement each other's needs for a more efficient global development.

IDFC was founded in 2011 during the annual meeting of the International Monetary Fund and the World Bank.

IDFC's Secretariat is headquartered in Paris, in the same building as the French Development Agency (5 rue Roland-Barthes, Paris).

The current IDFC's President (appointed in October 2017) is Rémy Rioux, chief executive of the French Development Agency.

Members
As of July 2018, IDFC had 23 members:

 Black Sea Trade and Development Bank
 French Development Agency
 Croatian Bank for Reconstruction and Development
 KfW
 Industrial Development Bank of Turkey
 Vnesheconombank
 Small Industries Development Bank of India
 Indonesia Exim Bank
 China Development Bank
 Islamic Corporation for the Development of the Private Sector
 Korea Development Bank
 Japan International Cooperation Agency
 Central American Bank for Economic Integration
 CAF – Development Bank of Latin America
 Nacional Financiera
 Bancoldex
 Corporación Financiera de Desarrollo
 Banco Nacional de Desenvolvimento Econômico e Social
 Banco Estado
 Caisse de Dépôt et de Gestion
 Development Bank of Southern Africa
 West African Development Bank
 Eastern and Southern African Trade and Development Bank (formerly the PTA Bank)

The International Investment Bank was due to join IDFC by October 2018.

Objectives
 Agenda setting by joining forces and networking on issues of similar interest
 Identifying and developing joint business opportunities
 Sharing know-how and best practice experiences for mutual learning

See also

 International financial institutions

References

External links
 Official website

International economic organizations

Supranational banks
International development
Multilateral development banks